The John and Mable Ringling Museum of Art is the official state art museum of Florida, located in Sarasota, Florida. It was established in 1927 as the legacy of Mable Burton Ringling and John Ringling for the people of Florida. Florida State University assumed governance of the museum in 2000.

The institution offers 21 galleries of European paintings as well as Cypriot antiquities and Asian, American, and contemporary art. The museum's art collection currently consists of more than 10,000 objects that include a variety of paintings, sculpture, drawings, prints, photographs, and decorative arts from ancient through contemporary periods and from around the world. The most celebrated items in the museum are 16th–20th-century European paintings, including a world-renowned collection of Peter Paul Rubens paintings. Other artists represented include Benjamin West, Marcel Duchamp, Mark Kostabi, Diego Velázquez, Paolo Veronese, Rosa Bonheur, Gianlorenzo Bernini, Giuliano Finelli, Lucas Cranach the Elder, Frans Hals, Nicolas Poussin, Joseph Wright of Derby, Thomas Gainsborough, Eugène Boudin, and Benedetto Pagni.

In all, more than  have been added to the campus, which includes the art museum, circus museum, and Ca' d'Zan, the Ringlings' mansion, which has been restored, along with the historic Asolo Theater. New additions to the campus include the McKay Visitor's Pavilion, the Kotler-Coville Glass Pavilion exhibiting studio glass art, the Johnson-Blalock Education Building housing The Ringling Art Library and Cuneo Conservation Lab, the Tibbals Learning Center complete with a miniature circus, the Searing Wing, a  gallery for special exhibitions attached to the art museum, the Chao Center for Asian Art, and the Monda Gallery for Contemporary Art.

History

Construction and planning 
John Ringling would hire architect John H. Phillips to design the museum in 1925. Phillips decided that Sarasota would be a good setting for a museum with Italian-inspired architecture. Dredging and filling work would be done on the marshy area the museum was located at named Shell Beach. Construction would start on June 27, 1927. As Ringling was strapped for funds he decided to abandon his two other projects he was working on: the Sarasota Ritz Carlton and Ringling Estates.

Ringling also wanted to have an art school on the museum's grounds. After the death of John's wife Mable in June 1929 he would become more adamant about creating an art school, John Ringling University but this did not materialize as he was financially constrained and lacked personal experience in higher education.

Initially, construction work was done by Hageman and Harris but was later replaced by another contractor, Chase and McElroy.  Originally scheduled to open in February 1930, it was postponed but; a brief opening was done that year and another in 1931. The museum would open permanently on January 17, 1932.

Opening to Florida State University transfer 
John Ringling willed his property and art collection, plus a $1.2 million endowment, to the people of State of Florida upon his death in 1936. One instruction of the will states that no one has permission to ever change the official name of the museum. For the next 10 years the museum was opened irregularly and not maintained professionally, Ca' d'Zan was not opened to the public, while the state fought with Ringling's creditors over the estate (Ringling was nearly bankrupt at his death; Florida would finally prevail in court in 1946).

A. Everett "Chick" Austin Jr. who was the former director of the Wadsworth Athenaeum and a member of the International Brotherhood of Magicians would be appointed as the director of the museum in 1946. From 1932 to 1946, the museum had no director and at the time of his appointment he would be the first "outside" director of it; as Mable Ringling was listed as the director in the museum's charter but Mable died in 1929 before the museum opened. 

Even after prevailing in court, the Florida Department of State (who had initial responsibility for the museum) did virtually nothing to manage the endowment or maintain the property, while the local community (believing the museum to be the state's responsibility) did little to support the museum. By the late 1990s Ca' d'Zan was falling apart (as were the exterior footpaths and roads), the museum had a serious roof leak plus its security systems were wholly inadequate to protect its collection, and the Asolo Theater building was actually condemned, while the $1.2 million endowment had grown to only $2 million.

Florida State University transfer 
The State of Florida transferred responsibility of the museum to Florida State University in 2000. As part of the reorganization it created a board of trustees consisting of no more than 31 members, of which at least one-third must be residents of either Manatee or Sarasota counties.

In 2002 it appropriated $42.9 million in construction funds, with one condition: the museum had to raise $50 million in private sector support within five years; the museum raised $55 million by the deadline.

In January 2007, a $76-million expansion and renovation of the Museum of Art was finished. A new Arthur F. and Ulla R. Searing Wing was added—the new wing being the final component of a five-year master plan that has transformed the museum. It is now the sixteenth largest in the United States.

In 2013, The John and Mable Ringling Museum of Art was renamed The Ringling.

Ringling estate
Aside from the art museum, the estate also contains the Ringling's mansion, Ca' d'Zan, Mable Ringling's rose garden, the Circus Museum and Tibbals Learning Center, the historic Asolo Theater, the Ringling Art Library, the Secret Garden, gravesite of John and Mable Ringling and the FSU Center for the Performing Arts.

Dwarf Garden

The Dwarf Garden showcases stone statues that the Ringlings brought back with them during their years of travel in Europe.

Ca' d'Zan
Ca' d'Zan, (Venetian for "House of John"), is the waterfront residence built for Mable and John Ringling. The mansion was designed by architect Dwight James Baum with assistance from the Ringlings, built by Owen Burns, and was completed in 1926.

It is designed in Venetian Gothic style. Overlooking Sarasota Bay, the mansion became the center for cultural life in Sarasota for several years. The residence was restored in 2002.

Rose Garden
Mable Ringling's rose garden was completed in 1913 while she and John were living in another house on the property. The rose garden is located near the original Mary Louise and Charles N. Thompson residence within the beautifully landscaped grounds overlooking Sarasota Bay. John and Mable are both buried very near this garden, just to the north, in what is called the Secret Garden.

Circus Museum and the Tibbals Learning Center
The Circus Museum, established in 1948, is the first museum of its kind to document the history of the circus. The museum has a collection of handbills, posters and art prints, circus paper, business records, wardrobe, performing props, circus equipment, and parade wagons. The adjacent Tibbals Learning Center contains The Howard Bros. Circus model. Built by Howard Tibbals, this -inch-to-the-foot scale model display is inspired by the Ringling Bros. and Barnum & Bailey Circus from 1919 to 1938, and is billed as the "world's largest miniature circus".

Wisconsin railroad car

John Ringling owned a private railroad car and used it from 1905 to 1917 to travel with his circus, take vacations, and conduct business trips. Ringling named it after his home state of Wisconsin, which was also where his circus was quartered.

The Wisconsin was built by the Pullman Company in Pullman, Illinois. Its cost of $11,325.23 was only about half the price of a comparable Pullman train car of the time, as it was outfitted with walls taken from other railroad cars. It is divided into an observation room, three staterooms, a dining room, a kitchen, a bathroom, and servants' quarters. The interior is made of mahogany and other woods, intricate moldings, gold-leaf stencils, and stained glass. The 10-foot high ceilings are painted viva gold, baize green, and fiery brown.

When New York City banned wooden train cars from its tunnels, John Ringling decided to sell the Wisconsin. Later, the Norfolk Southern Railroad purchased the train car and renamed it Virginia; the railroad used it as a business car for its officials. It was then sold to the Atlantic & East Carolina Railway, which renamed it Carolina, adapted it into a fishing lodge, and placed it in Morehead City, North Carolina. The North Carolina Transportation Museum became the next owner of the train car and kept it in covered storage on its grounds in Spencer, North Carolina.

The Wisconsin's next and current owner became the John and Mable Ringling Museum. A $417,240 federal grant awarded to the Florida Department of Transportation helped pay for the restoration of the Wisconsin's exterior, which was carried out by the Edwards Rail Car Company in Montgomery, Alabama. An anonymous donation of $100,000 then brought the Wisconsin's interior back to its Gilded Age state, the work for which was done at the museum. The Sarasota County Parks and Recreation Department donated railroad tracks, which became available as part of the Rails to Trails project, for the train car. The rails were laid by volunteers from the Florida Railroad Museum in Parrish, Florida.

Ringling Art Library

The Ringling Art Library is one of the largest art reference libraries in the southeastern United States. Though it has been a part of the Ringling Museum of Art since its opening in 1946, the library gained a permanent home and reading room in 2007. the library was originally located inside one of the two late 19th interiors designed by Richard Morris Hunt. It was in gallery 20, the Astor Gallery (it was originally the oak paneled library of John Jacob Astor). The first 500 books were art books that John Ringling bequeathed to the state of Florida. The collection of nearly 90,000 volumes includes some 800 books originally owned by John Ringling himself and the collection of the Ringling's first director, A. Everett Austin, Jr. The collection covers the 16th-21st centuries and topics like fine and decorative art, art history, architecture, fashion, and theater. The library contains 70, 000 items including a collection of rare books from 16th century to the present, collections of European Art (especially renaissance and baroque, favorites of John Ringling) Asian Art, Studio Glass, Circus history and culture, 60 thousand books and other materials spanning the entire history of art and architecture, and hundreds of specialized art databases. It even contains a facsimile of the Guttenberg Bible, gifted to John Ringling by a German rare book collector.

The library hosts a free book club, the Literati Book Club, which discusses famous authors & art history. Each month, the Literati Book Club offers two meetings at which the same book is discussed; on one day the meeting is in the evening and the other day the meeting is in the morning. Currently, in 2021, and until further notice, the Literati Book Club is meeting via Zoom. Other regular events include a Saturday for Educators Workshop series which is designed to enhance educators’ understanding of The Ringling's collections and special exhibitions, while also providing an opportunity for networking, collaboration, and inspiration. The Ringling Art Library also hosts an online blog. The library is open to the public and there is a reading room for patrons to view and use materials; however, the collection is non-circulating and items cannot be checked out.

The Art Library maintains a large digital image collection of items within Special Collections through Flickr. The library is a non-circulating research library. The library has open stacks, and you may browse through the collection and enjoy the materials in the library's Reading Room. As a part of Florida State University libraries, researchers at the Ringling have access to an ebook library, scholarly databases, and curated research guides. The library is one of the 11 libraries of the Florida State University Library system. It is also one of the largest and most comprehensive art research libraries in the southeastern US. The collection is also searchable through the FSU Libraries Catalog. Admission to the library is free, and open to the public on weekdays, from 1–5.

The Secret Garden
In 1991, John, Mable and his sister, Ida Ringling North, were buried on the property just in front and to the right of the Ca' d'Zan. It is called the secret garden and John is buried between the two women. There is a locked gate around the 3 graves and tombstones. There is a garden and statues in front of the gate. During the day, during visiting hours, the gate is unlocked and opened. On the anniversary of John Ringling's birthday, neighboring New College students will often sneak in and place a cigar on John's grave.

See also
 Circus World Museum
 Ringling International Arts Festival

References

External links

1927 establishments in Florida
Art museums established in 1927
Art museums and galleries in Florida
Circus museums in the United States
Florida State University
Former private collections in the United States
Historic house museums in Florida
Museums in Sarasota, Florida
Museums of American art
University museums in Florida
Ringling Bros. and Barnum & Bailey Circus